301 Squadron or 301st Squadron may refer to:

United States
301st Air Refueling Squadron
301st Airlift Squadron
301st Bombardment Squadron
301st Fighter Squadron
301st Intelligence Squadron
301st Rescue Squadron

Other counties
No. 301 Polish Bomber Squadron, a World War II unit of the Polish Air Forces in Great Britain
301st Tactical Fighter Squadron (JASDF), Japan
301 Squadron (Portugal)